Muvva Gopaludu is a 1987 Indian Telugu-language romantic drama film produced by S. Gopala Reddy and directed by Kodi Ramakrishna. The film stars Nandamuri Balakrishna, Vijayashanti and Shobana, with music composed by K. V. Mahadevan. It is a remake of the Tamil film Aruvadai Naal (1986). The film was released on 19 May 1987.

Plot 
The film begins in a village where Gopi an opulent active youth is squashed by his vicious brother-in-law Basava Raju with petrifying. Yet, his sister Nagalakshmi warmth on him. Meanwhile, Nirmala a medico reared by a Christian missionary is appointed as govt doctor in the same village. Nevertheless, Nirmala is unbiased about it as her ambition is to turn into a nun. But following a request of a Mother proceeds to the village. Wherein, she meets Father Lawrence an altruistic admired by the public. 

Presently, Gopi & Nirmala have been acquainted in an altercation and developed a good intimacy. Once, Gopi attempts suicide as Basavaraju's mortifications peak. Forthwith, he is safeguarded by Nirmala when he puts his dearness into words. Now Nirmala is under the dichotomy when Father Lawrance enlightens her that love is not a sin. Plus, it would be fair if she knits Gopi. Basava Raju is conscious of it and fakes his acceptance but plots to wedlock Gopi with his daughter Krishnaveni for his wealth. Nirmala delightfully moves to invite her revivalists for the espousal. Consequently, Basava Raju forges Krishnaveni's puberty ceremony. On that occasion, he ruses by hiding a wedding chain Mangalsutram in a garland. Being unbeknownst Gopi puts it to Krishnaveni and Basava Raju declares them as man & wife. 

In the interim, Nirmala returns, understands the existing state, and is about to quit but backs on plead of the villagers. Grief-stricken Gopi turns into a drunkard. Spotting his pain Krishnaveni complains against Basava Raju and divulges the actuality with aid of Father Lawerance. Thus, the Panchayat passes on the annulment of Krishnaveni's marriage and also provides clearance to the nuptials of Gopi & Nirmala. As of today, the complete village comes together to perform the alliance when enraged Basava Raju onslaughts on them in which Father Lawerance is slain. On the verge of killing Nirmala, she sets foot in the church which stuns everyone. At this point, inflamed Gopi slaughters Basava Raju at the instigation of his sister and is sentenced to 7 years. At last, Gopi is acquitted Krishnaveni gives him a warm welcome and Nirmala appears as a nun. Finally, the movie ends on a happy note Nirmala uniting Gopi & Krishnaveni.

Cast 
Nandamuri Balakrishna as Muvva Gopala Krishna Prasad / Gopi
Vijayashanti as Nirmala
Shobhana as Krishnaveni
Rao Gopal Rao as Basava Raju
Gollapudi Maruti Rao as Father Lawrence
Chidatala Appa Rao as Villager
K.K. Sarma as Villager
Telephone Satyanarayana as President
Jayachitra as Nagalakshmi
Satyavathi as Jalaga Lakshamma
Anitha as Nun
Chilaka Radha as Seetalu
Kalpana Rai as Nukalu
Y. Vijaya as Veeramma

Soundtrack 
Music composed by K. V. Mahadevan. Lyrics were written by C. Narayana Reddy.

Accolades 
 Nandi Award for Second Best Story Writer – G. M. Kumar

References

External links 
 

1980s Telugu-language films
1987 films
1987 romantic drama films
Films directed by Kodi Ramakrishna
Films scored by K. V. Mahadevan
Indian romantic drama films
Telugu remakes of Tamil films